Hoseynabad-e Mish Mast (also Romanized as Ḩoseynābād-e Mīsh Mast; also known as Ḩasanābād-e Mīsh Mast, Ḩoseynābād, and Husainābād) is a village in Qanavat Rural District, in the Central District of Qom County, Qom Province, Iran. At the 2006 census, its population was 1,066, in 260 families.

References 

Populated places in Qom Province